The 1992 United States Senate election in Oklahoma was held November 3, 1992. Incumbent Republican U.S. Senator Don Nickles won re-election to his third term.

Major candidates

Democratic
 Steve Lewis, former state representative

Republican
 Don Nickles, incumbent U.S. Senator

Results

See also
 1992 United States Senate elections

References

1992 Oklahoma elections
Oklahoma
1992